Invasion of the Body Snatchers is a 1956 American science fiction horror film produced by Walter Wanger, directed by Don Siegel, and starring Kevin McCarthy and Dana Wynter. The black-and-white film was shot in Superscope and in the film noir style. Daniel Mainwaring adapted the screenplay from Jack Finney's 1954 science fiction novel The Body Snatchers. The film was released by Allied Artists Pictures as a double feature with the British science fiction film The Atomic Man (and in some markets with Indestructible Man).

The film's storyline concerns an extraterrestrial invasion that begins in the fictional California town of Santa Mira. Alien plant spores have fallen from space and grown into large seed pods, each one capable of producing a visually identical copy of a human. As each pod reaches full development, it assimilates the physical traits, memories, and personalities of each sleeping person placed near it until only the replacement is left; these duplicates, however, are devoid of all human emotion. Little by little, a local doctor uncovers this "quiet" invasion and attempts to stop it.

The slang expression "pod people" that arose in late 20th-century U.S. culture refers to the emotionless duplicates seen in the film. Invasion of the Body Snatchers was selected in 1994 for preservation in the United States National Film Registry by the Library of Congress for being "culturally, historically, or aesthetically significant."

Plot
A psychiatrist, Dr. Hill, is called to the emergency room of a Los Angeles hospital, where a highly agitated man is being held in custody. The man identifies himself as a doctor, and recounts, in flashback, the events leading up to his arrest and arrival at the hospital.

In the nearby town of Santa Mira, Dr. Miles Bennell sees a number of patients apparently suffering from Capgras delusion, the belief that their relatives have been replaced with identical-looking impostors. Returning from a trip, he meets his former girlfriend, Becky Driscoll, who has recently come back to town after a divorce. Becky's cousin Wilma expresses the same fear about her Uncle Ira, with whom she lives.

That evening, Miles and Becky are urgently called to the home of Bennell's friend, Jack Belicec, who has found what appears to be a dead body in his home. Inexplicably, it has no discernible facial features or fingerprints. To their horror, within a short period of time it begins to take on the exact physical features of Belicec. Later, another body is found in Becky's basement that is her exact duplicate. When Bennell calls psychiatrist Dr. Dan Kauffman to the scene, the bodies have mysteriously disappeared.

The following night, Bennell, Becky, Jack, and Jack's wife Teddy again find duplicates of themselves, emerging from giant seed pods in Bennell's greenhouse. They conclude that the townspeople are being replaced while asleep with exact physical copies. Bennell tries to make a long-distance call to federal authorities, but the phone operator claims that the lines are all busy and he cannot be put through, so Jack and Teddy drive off to seek help in the next town. Bennell and Becky soon realize that all of the town's inhabitants have been replaced and are devoid of any sort of humanity. They hide at Bennell's office for the night, vowing to stay awake so as not to be replaced by their duplicates.

The next morning, truckloads of the giant pods arrive in the town center. They listen as police chief Nick Grivett directs the others to take them to neighboring towns to be planted and used to replace their populations. Kauffman and Belicec, both of whom are now also "pod people", arrive at Bennell's office with new pods for Becky and Bennell. They reveal that an extraterrestrial life form is responsible for the invasion. After their takeover, humanity will lose all emotions and sense of individuality, creating a simplistic, bleak world.

After scuffling with and knocking out the aliens (Kauffman, Belicec, and Grivett), Bennell and Becky escape from the office. Outside, they pretend to be emotionless pod people. After seeing a dog dart out into traffic, Becky screams and her reaction exposes their humanity. A town alarm is sounded and the couple flee on foot, pursued by the pod people.

Exhausted, they manage to escape and hide in an abandoned mine outside town, struggling to stay awake. Later, they hear music, and Bennell leaves Becky briefly to investigate. Over a hill, he sees a large greenhouse farm with hundreds of giant seed pods being loaded onto trucks. Bennell returns to tell Becky. Upon kissing her, Bennell realizes, to his horror, that she fell asleep before he returned and is now one of them. Becky sounds the alarm as Bennell runs away. He is again chased, and eventually finds himself on a crowded highway. After seeing a transport truck bound for San Francisco and Los Angeles filled with the pods, he frantically screams at the passing motorists, "They're here already! You're next! You're next!"

Back at the hospital, Bennell finishes his story. Dr. Hill and the on-duty doctor step outside the room, the latter expressing his certainty that Bennell is psychotic. Just then, a truck driver is wheeled into the hall on a gurney after having been badly injured in an accident. It turns out that the man had to be dug out from under a load of giant pods coming from Santa Mira. Finally believing Bennell's story, Dr. Hill alerts the police to block the roads in and out of Santa Mira; the film ends with Bennell relieved as Hill calls the Federal Bureau of Investigation.

Cast

Starring
 Kevin McCarthy as Dr. Miles Bennell
 Dana Wynter as Becky Driscoll
 King Donovan as Jack Belicec
 Carolyn Jones as Theodora "Teddy" Belicec

Featuring
 Larry Gates as Dr. Dan Kauffman
 Virginia Christine as Wilma Lentz
 Ralph Dumke as Police Chief Nick Grivett
 Kenneth Patterson as Stanley Driscoll
 Guy Way as Officer Sam Janzek
 Jean Willes as Nurse Sally Withers
 Eileen Stevens as Anne Grimaldi
 Beatrice Maude as Grandma Grimaldi
 Whit Bissell (uncredited) as Dr. Hill
 Richard Deacon (uncredited) as Dr. Bassett

With
 Bobby Clark as Jimmy Grimaldi
 Tom Fadden as Uncle Ira Lentz
 Everett Glass as Dr. Ed Pursey
 Dabbs Greer as Mac Lomax
 Pat O'Malley as Baggage Man
 Sam Peckinpah as Charlie, the Gas Meter Reader

Production

Novel and screenplay
Jack Finney's novel ends with the extraterrestrials, who have a life span of no more than five years, leaving Earth after they realize that humans are offering strong resistance, despite having little reasonable chance against the alien invasion.

Budgeting and casting
Invasion of the Body Snatchers was originally scheduled for a 24-day shoot and a budget of US$454,864. The studio later asked Wanger to cut the budget significantly. The producer proposed a shooting schedule of 20 days and a budget of $350,000.

Initially, Wanger considered Gig Young, Dick Powell, Joseph Cotten, and several others for the role of Miles. For Becky, he considered casting Anne Bancroft, Donna Reed, Kim Hunter, Vera Miles, and others. With the lower budget, however, he abandoned these choices and cast Richard Kiley, who had just starred in The Phenix City Story for Allied Artists. Kiley turned the role down and Wanger cast Kevin McCarthy, an Academy Award nominee five years earlier for Death of a Salesman, and relative newcomer Dana Wynter, who had done several major dramatic roles on television.

Future director Sam Peckinpah had a small part as Charlie, a meter reader. Peckinpah was a dialogue coach on five Siegel films in the mid-1950s, including this one.

Principal photography
Originally, producer Wanger and Siegel wanted to film Invasion of the Body Snatchers on location in Mill Valley, California, the town just north of San Francisco, that Jack Finney described in his novel. In the first week of January 1955, Siegel, Wanger, and screenwriter Daniel Mainwaring visited Finney to talk about the film version and to look at Mill Valley. The location proved too expensive, and Siegel with Allied Artist executives, found locations resembling Mill Valley in the Los Angeles area, including Sierra Madre, Chatsworth, Glendale, Los Feliz, Bronson, and Beachwood Canyons, all of which went on to make up the fictional town of "Santa Mira" for the film. In addition to these outdoor locations, much of the film was shot in the Allied Artists studio on the east side of Hollywood.

Invasion of the Body Snatchers was shot by cinematographer Ellsworth Fredericks in 23 days between March 23 and April 27, 1955. The cast and crew worked a six-day week with Sundays off. The production went over schedule by three days because of the night-for-night shooting that Siegel wanted. Additional photography took place in September 1955, filming a frame story on which the studio had insisted (see Original intended ending). The final budget was $382,190.

Post-production
The project was originally named The Body Snatchers after the Finney serial. However, Wanger wanted to avoid confusion with the 1945 Val Lewton film The Body Snatcher. The producer was unable to come up with a title and accepted the studio's choice, They Come from Another World and that was assigned in summer 1955. Siegel objected to this title and suggested two alternatives, Better Off Dead and Sleep No More, while Wanger offered Evil in the Night and World in Danger. None of these were chosen, and the studio settled on Invasion of the Body Snatchers in late 1955. The film was released at the time in France under the mistranslated title "L'invasion des profanateurs de sépultures" (literally: Invasion of the defilers of tombs), which remains unchanged today.

Wanger wanted to add a variety of speeches and prefaces. He suggested a voice-over introduction for Miles. While the film was being shot, Wanger tried to get permission in England to use a Winston Churchill quotation as a preface to the film. The producer sought out Orson Welles to voice the preface and a trailer for the film. He wrote speeches for Welles' opening on June 15, 1955, and worked to persuade Welles to do it, but was unsuccessful. Wanger considered science fiction author Ray Bradbury instead, but this did not happen, either. Mainwaring eventually wrote the voice-over narration himself.

The studio scheduled three film previews on the last days of June and the first day of July 1955. According to Wanger's memos at the time, the previews were successful. Later reports by Mainwaring and Siegel, however, contradict this, claiming that audiences could not follow the film and laughed in the wrong places. In response the studio removed much of the film's humor, "humanity" and "quality," according to Wanger. He scheduled another preview in mid-August that also did not go well. In later interviews Siegel pointed out that it was studio policy not to mix humor with horror.

Wanger saw the final cut in December 1955 and protested the use of the Superscope aspect ratio. Its use had been included in early plans for the film, but the first print was not made until December. Wanger felt that the film lost sharpness and detail. Siegel originally shot Invasion of the Body Snatchers in the 1.85:1 aspect ratio. Superscope was a post-production laboratory process designed to create an anamorphic print from non-anamorphic source material that would be projected at an aspect ratio of 2.00:1.

Original intended ending 
 
Both Siegel and Mainwaring were satisfied with the film as shot. The original ending did not include the flashback framing, and ended with Miles screaming as truckloads of pods pass him on the road. The studio, wary of a pessimistic conclusion, insisted on adding a prologue and epilogue suggesting a more optimistic outcome to the story, leading to the flashback framing. In this version, the film begins with Bennell in custody in a hospital emergency ward, telling a consulting psychiatrist (Whit Bissell) his story. In the closing scenes, pods are discovered at a highway accident, confirming Bennell's warning, and the authorities are alerted, likely stopping the pod distribution and resolving the extraterrestrial threat.

Mainwaring scripted this framing story and Siegel shot it on September 16, 1955, at the Allied Artists studio. In a later interview Siegel complained, "The film was nearly ruined by those in charge at Allied Artists who added a preface and ending that I don't like". In his autobiography Siegel added that "Wanger was very much against this, as was I. However, he begged me to shoot it to protect the film, and I reluctantly consented [...]".

While the Internet Movie Database states that the film had been revised to its original ending for a re-release in 1979, Steve Biodrowski of Cinefantastique magazine notes that the film was still being shown with the complete footage, including a 2005 screening at the Academy of Motion Picture Arts and Sciences honoring director Don Siegel.

Although most reviewers disliked it, George Turner (in American Cinematographer) and Danny Peary (in Cult Movies) endorsed the subsequently added frame story. Nonetheless, Peary emphasized that the added scenes changed significantly what he saw as the film's original intention.

Theatrical release
When the film was released domestically in February 1956, many theaters displayed several pods made of papier-mâché in theater lobbies and entrances, along with large lifelike black and white cutouts of McCarthy and Wynter running away from a crowd. The film earned more than $1 million in the first month, and in 1956 alone earned more than $2.5 million in the U.S. When the film was released in the U.K. (with cuts imposed by the British censors) in late 1956, the film earned more than a half million dollars in ticket sales.

Themes 
Some reviewers saw in the story a commentary on the dangers facing the United States for turning a blind eye to McCarthyism. Leonard Maltin wrote of a McCarthy-era subtext, or of bland conformity in postwar Eisenhower-era America. Others viewed it as an allegory for the loss of personal autonomy and individualism in the Soviet Union or communist systems in general.

For the BBC, David Wood summarized the circulating popular interpretations of the film as follows: "The sense of post-war, anti-communist paranoia is acute, as is the temptation to view the film as a metaphor for the tyranny of the McCarthy era." Danny Peary in Cult Movies pointed out that the studio-mandated addition of the framing story had changed the film's stance from anti-McCarthyite to anti-communist. Michael Dodd of The Missing Slate has called the movie "one of the most multifaceted horror films ever made", arguing that by "simultaneously exploiting the contemporary fear of infiltration by undesirable elements as well as a burgeoning concern over homeland totalitarianism in the wake of Senator Joseph McCarthy's notorious communist witch hunt, it may be the clearest window into the American psyche that horror cinema has ever provided".

In An Illustrated History of the Horror Film, Carlos Clarens saw a trend manifesting itself in science fiction films, dealing with dehumanization and fear of the loss of individual identity, being historically connected to the end of "the Korean War and the well publicized reports of brainwashing techniques". Comparing Invasion of the Body Snatchers with Robert Aldrich's Kiss Me Deadly and Orson Welles' Touch of Evil, Brian Neve found a sense of disillusionment rather than straightforward messages, with all three films being "less radical in any positive sense than reflective of the decline of [the screenwriters'] great liberal hopes".

Despite a general agreement among film critics regarding these political connotations of the film, actor Kevin McCarthy said in an interview included on the 1998 DVD release that he felt no political allegory was intended. The interviewer stated that he had spoken with the author of the novel, Jack Finney, who professed no specific political allegory in the work.

In his autobiography, I Thought We Were Making Movies, Not History, Walter Mirisch writes: "People began to read meanings into pictures that were never intended. The Invasion of the Body Snatchers is an example of that. I remember reading a magazine article arguing that the picture was intended as an allegory about the communist infiltration of America. From personal knowledge, neither Walter Wanger nor Don Siegel, who directed it, nor Dan Mainwaring, who wrote the script nor original author Jack Finney, nor myself saw it as anything other than a thriller, pure and simple".

Don Siegel spoke more openly of an existing allegorical subtext, but denied a strictly political point of view: "[...] I felt that this was a very important story. I think that the world is populated by pods and I wanted to show them. I think so many people have no feeling about cultural things, no feeling of pain, of sorrow. [...] The political reference to Senator McCarthy and totalitarianism was inescapable but I tried not to emphasize it because I feel that motion pictures are primarily to entertain and I did not want to preach". Film scholar J.P. Telotte wrote that Siegel intended for pods to be seductive; their spokesperson, a psychiatrist, was chosen to provide an authoritative voice that would appeal to the desire to "abdicate from human responsibility in an increasingly complex and confusing modern world."

Reception

Critical reception

Though Invasion of the Body Snatchers was largely ignored by critics on its initial run, Filmsite.org ranked it as one of the best films of 1956. The film holds a 98% approval rating and 9/10 rating at the film review aggregator website Rotten Tomatoes. The site's consensus reads: "One of the best political allegories of the 1950s, Invasion of the Body Snatchers is an efficient, chilling blend of sci-fi and horror".

In recent years critics such as Dan Druker of the Chicago Reader have called the film a "genuine Sci-Fi classic". Leonard Maltin described Invasion of the Body Snatchers as "influential, and still very scary". Time Out called the film one of the "most resonant" and "one of the simplest" of the genre. Mark Steyn described it as “a big film”, despite its limited budget.

Legacy
Invasion of the Body Snatchers was selected in 1994 for preservation in the United States National Film Registry by the Library of Congress as being "culturally, historically, or aesthetically significant". In June 2008, the American Film Institute revealed its "Ten top Ten" — the best ten films in ten "classic" American film genres — after polling more than 1,500 people from the creative community. Invasion of the Body Snatchers was acknowledged as the ninth best film in the science fiction genre. The film was also placed on AFI's AFI's 100 Years ... 100 Thrills, a list of America's most heart-pounding films.

The film was included on Bravo's 100 Scariest Movie Moments. Similarly, the Chicago Film Critics Association named it the 29th scariest film ever made. IGN ranked it as the 15th best sci-fi picture. Time magazine included Invasion of the Body Snatchers on their list of 100 all-time best films, the top 10 1950s Sci-Fi Movies, and Top 25 Horror Films. In 1999, Entertainment Weekly listed it as the 53rd best movie of all-time. Similarly, the book Four Star Movies: The 101 Greatest Films of All Time placed the movie at #60.

Home media
The film was released on DVD in 1998 by U.S.-label Republic (an identical re-release by Artisan followed in 2002); it includes the Superscope version plus a 1.375:1 Academy ratio version. The latter is not the original full frame edition, but a pan and scan reworking of the Superscope edition that loses visual detail.

DVD editions exist on the British market (including a computer colorized version), German market (as Die Dämonischen) and Spanish market (as La Invasión de los Ladrones de Cuerpos).

Several Blu-ray Disc versions have been released including two bare-bones Blu-ray Disc editions by Olive Films in 2012 and German company Al!ve (under the title Die Dämonischen) in 2018. Sinister Films released a Blu-ray in Italy on March 18, 2014. This version, under the title L'Invasione degli Ultracorpi, contained many special features including an interview with lead actor Kevin McCarthy and the 1957 Studio One episode entitled "The Night America Trembled", an unreleased filmed reconstruction of the famous Orson Welles radio transmission "War of the Worlds", starring Ed Asner, James Coburn, and Warren Beatty. Olive Films subsequently released a special edition Blu-ray in 2018, containing extensive bonus features including several featurettes, two Audio Commentaries, one with film historian Richard Harland Smith and a second with actors Kevin McCarthy and Dana Wynter, and filmmaker Joe Dante, and a 1985 archival interview with actor Kevin McCarthy.

Subsequent adaptations
There have been three subsequent adaptations of The Body Snatchers: Invasion of the Body Snatchers (1978), Body Snatchers (1993), and The Invasion (2007).

An untitled fourth adaptation from Warner Bros. is in development. David Leslie Johnson was signed to be the screenwriter.

It briefly inspired Assimilate (2019) which is also inspired by The Body Snatchers of the same name.

The film was the basis for the 2013 science fiction comedy The World's End and it has inspired two TV series, ABC's Invasion (2005 TV series), Apple TV+'s Invasion (2021 TV series), and a subplot in Netflix's Another Life (2019 TV series).

Related works
Robert A. Heinlein had previously developed this subject in his 1951 novel The Puppet Masters, written in 1950. The Puppet Masters was later plagiarized as the 1958 film The Brain Eaters, and adapted under contract in the 1994 film The Puppet Masters.

There are several thematically related works that followed Finney's 1955 novel The Body Snatchers, including Val Guest's Quatermass 2 and Gene Fowler's I Married a Monster from Outer Space.

A Looney Tunes parody of the film was released, entitled Invasion of the Bunny Snatchers (1992). The adaptation was directed by Greg Ford and places Bugs Bunny, Daffy Duck, Elmer Fudd, Yosemite Sam, and Porky Pig in the various roles of the story.

In 2018 theater company Team Starkid created the musical parody The Guy Who Didn't Like Musicals, the story of a Midwestern town that is overtaken by a singing alien hivemind. The musical parodies numerous horror and musical tropes, while the main character also wears within the show a suit reminiscent of Bennell's wardrobe.

The May 1981 issue of National Lampoon featured a parody titled "Invasion of the Money Snatchers"; the gentile population of Whiteville is taken over by pastrami sandwiches from outer space and turned into Jews.

The film was also parodied in the 2012 SpongeBob SquarePants episode "Planet of the Jellyfish" (referencing Planet of the Vampires and Planet of the Apes) featuring characters from Bikini Bottom being replaced by alien clones in their sleep.

Further reading
Grant, Barry Keith. 2010. Invasion of the body snatchers. New York: Palgrave Macmillan.

See also
List of American films of 1956

References

Notes

Bibliography

 Bernstein, Matthew. Walter Wanger: Hollywood Independent. St. Paul, Minneapolis: University of Minnesota Press, 2000. .
 Clarens, Carlos. An Illustrated History of the Horror Film. Oakville, Ontario, Canada: Capricorn Books, 1968. .
 LaValley, Al. Invasion of the Body Snatchers. New Brunswick, New Jersey: Rutgers University Press, 1989. .
 Maltin, Leonard. Leonard Maltin's Movie Guide 2009. New York: New American Library, 2009 (originally published as TV Movies, then Leonard Maltin's Movie & Video Guide), First edition 1969, published annually since 1988. .
 Mirisch, Walter. I Thought We Were Making Movies, Not History. Madison, Wisconsin: University of Wisconsin Press, 2008. .
 Neve, Brian. Film and Politics in America: A Social Tradition. Oxon, UK: Routledge, 1992. .
 Peary, Danny. Cult Movies: The Classics, the Sleepers, the Weird, and the Wonderful. New York: Dell Publishing, 1981. .
 Siegel, Don. A Siegel Film. An Autobiography. London: Faber & Faber, 1993. .
 Warren, Bill. Keep Watching the Skies: American Science Fiction Films of the Fifties, 21st Century Edition. Jefferson, North Carolina: McFarland & Company, 2009. .
 Weddle, David. If They Move ... Kill 'Em! New York: Grove Press, 1994. .

External links

 
 
 
 
 Invasion of the Body Snatchers essay by Robert Sklar at National Film Registry 
 Invasion of the Body Snatchers essay by Daniel Eagan in America's Film Legacy: The Authoritative Guide to the Landmark Movies in the National Film Registry, A&C Black, 2010 , pages 512-513 
 
 
 "Invasion of the Body Snatchers: A Tale for Our Times," by John W. Whitehead, Gadfly Online, November 26, 2001; discusses the political themes of the original film
 McCarthyism and the Movies
 Comparison of novel to the first three film adaptations
 Ann Hornaday, "The 34 best political movies ever made" The Washington Post Jan. 23, 2020, ranked #17

1956 films
1956 horror films
1950s monster movies
1950s science fiction films
1950s science fiction horror films
Alien invasions in films
Allied Artists films
American black-and-white films
American science fiction horror films
Apocalyptic films

Films about extraterrestrial life
Films about McCarthyism
Films directed by Don Siegel
Films produced by Walter Wanger
Films scored by Carmen Dragon
Films set in California
Monogram Pictures films
United States National Film Registry films
1950s English-language films
1950s American films